Scott Reeder (born 1970, Battle Creek, MI) is a multi-disciplinary artist in Chicago, IL. He is currently represented by Canada in New York, NY and Kavi Gupta in Chicago, IL.

Biography

Reeder is currently an associate professor of painting and drawing at the School of the Art Institute of Chicago. Reeder is best known for his irreverent take on modernism and memorable titles like 'Money in Bed' and 'Symmetrical Pirate.' A book of his Reeder's work, Scott Reeder: Ideas (cont.) was published by Mousse Publishing in 2019.

In 2002, with his brother Tyson Reeder, they established the storefront gallery General Store in Milwaukee, Wisconsin. General Store curated the exhibitions Drunk vs. Stoned (2004) and Drunk vs. Stoned 2 (2005) at Gavin Brown’s Enterprise, New York, and The Early Show (2005) at White Columns, New York. The Reeders also organized the Dark Fair, an art fair operated in a black-walled space lit only with candlelight, at the Swiss Institute Contemporary Art New York in 2008 and as part of Art Cologne in 2009. Scott and Tyson Reeder additionally operate Club Nutz, billed as the world’s smallest comedy club. First established in a small 8’ x 8’ room adjacent to the Green Gallery in Milwaukee, Club Nutz has traveled to the Frieze Art Fair in London, the Museum of Contemporary Art Chicago, and Salon 94 in New York to host open-mics, dance parties, screenings, and lectures.

Exhibitions 
Reeder currently has a solo exhibition, Didactic Sunsets, on view at Canada in New York, NY. In 2014, he debuted his first feature-length film, Moon Dust, shot over the span of eleven years. Set 100 years in the future, Moon Dust tells the absurd and sometimes heartbreaking story of a failing resort on the moon. Moon Dust has screened at Anthology Film Archives, NY, Whitney Museum of American Art, The Museum of Contemporary Art, Chicago and Kunsthall Stavanger, Norway. In March 2019, Reeder opened an exhibition titled “B-Side of the Moon” at the John Michael Kohler Art Center in Sheboygan, Wi. This exhibition facilitated the production of a feature length film; a sequel to Reeder’s first feature Moon Dust. Reeder’s paintings and projects have been reviewed in Artforum, Art & Text, Art Review, FlashArt, Frieze, The New York Times, Art News, Art In America, TimeOut, The Village Voice and The New Yorker.

Select Solo and Two-Person Shows:

2020   Didactic Sunsets, Canada, New York, NY

2019   B-Side of the Moon, Kohler Arts Center, Sheboygan, WI

2015   Context Burger, Retrospective, Hudson, NY

           Put The Cat On The Phone, Kavi Gupta, Chicago

           More Work, Natalia Hug, Cologne

           It Gets Beta, Marlborough Chelsea, NY (with Andrew Kuo)

2014   Moon Dust, 356 Mission Road, Los Angeles, California

2013   People Call Me Scott, Lisa Cooley, New York

           The Future is Stupid, Green Gallery, Milwaukee, (with Ken Kagami)

           Paintings of Things, Kavi Gupta, Berlin, Germany

           Scott Reeder, Kavi Gupta, Chicago, Illinois

2011   Scott Reeder, Museum of Contemporary Art, Chicago, Illinois

           Scott Reeder, Gavlak Gallery, Palm Beach, FL

2010   Scott Reeder, Luce Gallery, Torino, Italy

2008   Didactic Sunset, Gavlak Gallery, Palm Beach, Florida

           Scott Reeder and Tyson Reeder, Daniel Reich Gallery, New York

           Nohl Fellowshio Exhibition, Inova at the Peck School of the Arts, Milwaukee

2006   Scott Reeder: New Works, Daniel Reich Gallery, New York

           Scott Reeder: French Thoughts, Jack Hanley, San Francisco, California

2005   Scott Reeder – Moon Museum (Scene 51: Shots 1-2), Midway Contemporary Art,

           Minneapolis, Minnesota

           Intelligent Design, Gavin Brown’s enterprise 620A, New York (with Tyson Reeder)

2003   Moon Dust, Gallery 400, Chicago, Illinois

2002   Scott Reeder: Flowers, Daniel Reich Gallery, New York

           The Suburban, Oak Park (with Tyson Reeder)

           Deluxe Projects, Chicago (with Milhaus)

2001   Bronwyn Keenan Gallery, New York (in association with Daniel Reich Gallery)

           Pretty Funny: Scott Reeder and David Robbins, Allston Skirt Gallery, Boston

2000   China Art Objects, Los Angeles (with Laura Owens)

           Angstrom Gallery, Dallas, Texas (with Cameron Martin)

1999   Pat Hearn Gallery, New York

           L.A.C.E., Los Angeles (with Michelle Lopez)

1998   Hermetic Gallery, Milwaukee, Wisconsin

References

External links
Canada
The New York Times
Frieze
Art in America
Artnews

Living people
20th-century American painters
20th-century American male artists
American male painters
21st-century American painters
21st-century American male artists
American sculptors
1970 births